The Seymour-Conkling family is a family of politicians from the United States.

Horatio Seymour 1778-1857, U.S. Senator from Vermont 1821-1833.
Henry Seymour 1780-1837, New York State Senator 1815-1819, 1821-1822. Brother of Horatio Seymour.
Origen S. Seymour 1804-1881, Connecticut State Representative 1842 1849-1850 1880, U.S. Representative from Connecticut 1851-1855, Judge in Connecticut 1855-1863, candidate for Governor of Connecticut 1864 1865, Justice of the Connecticut Supreme Court 1870-1874, Chief Justice of the Connecticut Supreme Court 1873-1874. Nephew of Horatio Seymour and Henry Seymour.
Horatio Seymour 1810-1886, New York Assemblyman 1842 1844-1846, Mayor of Utica, New York 1843; candidate for Governor of New York 1850; Governor of New York 1853-1855 1863-1865; candidate for the Democratic nomination for President of the United States 1860; delegate to the Democratic National Convention 1864; candidate for President of the United States 1868; Presidential Elector for New York 1876. Son of Henry Seymour.
Edward W. Seymour 1832-1892, Connecticut State Senator 1876, U.S. Representative from Connecticut 1873-1877. Son of Origin Storrs Seymour.
Horatio Seymour Jr., New York Surveyor 1878-1881. Nephew of Horatio Seymour.
Alfred Conkling 1789-1874, U.S. Representative from New York 1821-1823, Judge of U.S. District Court of Northern District of New York 1825-1852, U.S. Minister to Mexico 1852-1853.
Frederick A. Conkling 1816-1891, U.S. Representative from New York 1861-1863. Son of Alfred Conkling.
Roscoe Conkling 1829-1888, Mayor of Utica, New York 1858-1859; U.S. Representative from New York 1859-1863 1865-1867; U.S. Senator from New York 1867 1869-1881; candidate for the Republican nomination for President of the United States 1876; delegate to the Republican National Convention 1880. Son of Alfred Conkling, brother-in-law of Horatio Seymour.
Alfred Conkling Coxe 1847-1923, Judge of U.S. District Court of Northern District of New York 1882, Judge of U.S. Court of Appeals 1902-1917. Nephew of Alfred Conkling.

Political families of the United States
Conkling family